Sweat It Out is the fourth release by the band The Pink Spiders. The album was made available on September 23, 2008, through Mean Buzz Records/Adrenaline Music.

Track listing

"Busy Signals" - 3:10
"Gimme Chemicals" - 3:29
"Seventeen Candles" - 3:14
"Falling with Every Step" - 4:19
"Truth or Dare" - 3:02
"Don't Wait for Me" - 3:54
"Stranglehold" - 3:09
"Settling for You" - 3:23
"Please Maria" - 3:47
"Sleeping on the Floor" - 2:54
"Trust No One" - 2:44
"Here Comes Trouble" - 2:44
"Mrs. Ruston" - 4:17

Adrenaline Music Group store digital download EP bonus tracks
 "Teenage Graffiti"
 "Knock Knock"
 "We Do It All the Time"
 "Typical Danger"
 "Don't Wait for Me (acoustic)"

References

External links
 The Pink Spiders' Official Website
 The Pink Spiders' Official MySpace

2008 albums
The Pink Spiders albums